The Ministry of Environment is the government ministry, part of the Lebanese cabinet.

History and profile
The ministry was established in 1992 under Law 216/93.

It is responsible for the environment of Lebanon. More specifically, it deals with the protection of  the environment in general, setting regulations and standards, and provides advises on the productive use of implementing projects and programme in a sustainable manner.

References

External links
 Ministry of Environment website

1992 establishments in Lebanon
Lebanon, Environment
Environment
Lebanon